Yuliya Gennadiyevna Tabakova (born 1 May 1980, in Kaluga) is a Russian track and field sprint athlete, competing internationally for Russia.

She won the silver medal in the 4 × 100 m relay at the 2004 Olympic Games in Athens, Greece.

References

 Russian news article, with photograph 
 Profile  on sports-reference.com

1980 births
Living people
Sportspeople from Kaluga
Russian female sprinters
Olympic female sprinters
Olympic athletes of Russia
Olympic silver medalists for Russia
Olympic silver medalists in athletics (track and field)
Athletes (track and field) at the 2004 Summer Olympics
Medalists at the 2004 Summer Olympics
World Athletics Championships athletes for Russia
World Athletics Championships medalists
European Athletics Championships medalists
Russian Athletics Championships winners